William Calvert may refer to:

 William Calvert (Australian politician) (1871–1942), member of the Tasmanian Legislative Council for Huon 1924–42
 William Calvert (cricketer) (1839–1894), New Zealand cricketer
 William Calvert (MP) (c. 1703–1761), Lord Mayor of London 1748–49, MP for Old Sarum 1755–61 and for the City of London 1742–47
 William Samuel Calvert (1859–1930), Canadian politician

See also 
 Calvert (name)